The Legend of Sleepy Hollow is a 1980 American made-for-television produced by Sunn Classic Pictures as a part of their Classics Illustrated series. Loosely based on Washington Irving's 1820 short story, it was filmed in Utah and shown on NBC. It starred Jeff Goldblum as Ichabod Crane, Meg Foster as Katrina von Tassel, and Dick Butkus as Brom Bones. The film is also known as La leggenda di Sleepy Hollow in Italy. It was directed by Henning Schellerup. Executive producer Charles Sellier was nominated for an Emmy Award for his work on the movie..

In a departure from the original story, the film ends with Ichabod arriving at Katrina's house and the Headless Horseman returning to the dark forest. It also introduces an original character, widow Thelma Dumkey; while Brom Bones and Ichabod Crane are rivals for Katrina, Thelma is Katrina's rival for Brom Bones. Thelma and Brom become engaged at the end of the film.

Cast 
Jeff Goldblum as Ichabod Crane
Paul Sand as Frederic Dutcher
Meg Foster as Katrina Van Tassel
Laura Campbell as Thelma Dumkey
Dick Butkus as Brom Bones
James Griffith as Squire Van Tassel
Michael Ruud as Winthrop Palmer
H.E.D. Redford as Coral
Tiger Thompson as Ted Dumkey
John Sylvester White as Fritz Vanderhoof
Michael Witt as Jan Van Tassel
Marneen Fields as Singer #1 (uncredited)

Production
Parts of the film were shot in Park City, Utah.

References

External links 

English-language television shows
1980s ghost films
NBC network original films
Films based on The Legend of Sleepy Hollow
1980 films
1980 horror films
1980 television films
Films shot in Utah
American horror television films
Films directed by Henning Schellerup
1980s American films